Stanisław Zaremba (3 October 1863 – 23 November 1942) was a Polish mathematician and engineer. His research in partial differential equations, applied mathematics and classical analysis, particularly on harmonic functions, gained him a wide recognition. He was one of the mathematicians who contributed to the success of the Polish School of Mathematics through his teaching and organizational skills as well as through his research. Apart from his research works, Zaremba wrote many university textbooks and monographies.

He was a professor of the Jagiellonian University (since 1900), member of Academy of Learning (since 1903), co-founder and president of the Polish Mathematical Society (1919).

He should not be confused with his son Stanisław Krystyn Zaremba, also a mathematician.

Biography

Zaremba was born on 3 October 1863 in Romanówka, present-day Ukraine. The son of an engineer, he was educated at a grammar school in Saint Petersburg and studied at the Institute of Technology of the same city obtaining is diploma in engineering in 1886. The same year he left Saint Petersburg and went to Paris to study mathematics: he received his degree from the Sorbonne in 1889. He stayed in France until 1900, when he joined the faculty at the Jagiellonian University in Kraków. His years in France enabled him to establish a strong bridge between Polish mathematicians and those in France.

He died on 23 November 1942 in Kraków, during the German occupation of Poland.

Work

Research activity

Selected publication
 
 

See also
 Kraków School of Mathematics
 Mixed boundary condition

Notes

References
.
.
.
, .

External links

19th-century Polish mathematicians
20th-century Polish mathematicians
Corresponding Members of the Russian Academy of Sciences (1917–1925)
Corresponding Members of the USSR Academy of Sciences
Members of the Lwów Scientific Society
Polish engineers
Mathematical analysts
University of Paris alumni
Academic staff of Jagiellonian University
1863 births
1942 deaths